Tri-state may refer to:

Tri-State Airport, a public airport located in West Virginia, United States
Tri-state area, an area where three states of the U.S. meet at one point or share a metropolitan area
Tri-State (basketball), the 3-on-3 basketball team that plays in the BIG3
Tri-State Bird Rescue and Research, a wildlife rehabilitation organization specializing in bird rescue during oil spills 
Tri-State Christian Television, a network of several religious TV stations
Tri-State League, five circuits in American minor league baseball
Tri-state logic, electronic logic gate type
Tri-State Tollway, a U.S. toll road
Trine University, formerly Tri-State University, a university in Angola, Indiana
Tri-State (album), a 2006 album by Above & Beyond
Tri-State (band), an American rock band
Tri-state check box, specific graphical user interface element
Tri-State Tornado, the 1925 deadliest single tornado ever recorded in the United States
Tri-State district, a historic lead-zinc mining district (Missouri, Kansas and Oklahoma)

See also
Tri-State Conference (disambiguation)
Tripoint (disambiguation)
Illinois–Indiana–Kentucky tri-state area
New York metropolitan area (New York, New Jersey, Connecticut)